Nitra nad Ipľom is a village and municipality in the Lučenec District in the Banská Bystrica Region of Slovakia.

External links
Statistical Office of the Slovak Republic

Villages and municipalities in Lučenec District